Toft Hill may refer to:
 Toft Hill, County Durham
 Toft Hill, Lincolnshire